The 2014 NBA Development League expansion draft was the seventh expansion draft of the National Basketball Association Development League (D-League). The draft was held on September 2, 2014 so that the newly founded Westchester Knicks could acquire players for the upcoming 2014–15 season. The 16 players were chosen from a pool of unprotected players among the league's teams. Each returning D-League team could protect up to 12 of their players from being selected.

Two of the players that the Knicks chose had previously been named NBA D-League All-Stars: Jerome Jordan and DaJuan Summers. Three additional players had also been previously selected in an NBA draft: Craig Brackins (2010), Luke Harangody (2010), Kris Joseph (2012).

Key

Draft

References
General

Specific

draft
NBA G League expansion draft
Westchester Knicks